John Thomas "Dickie" Downs (13 August 1886 – 24 March 1949) was a footballer who played as a full back for Barnsley, Everton, Brighton & Hove Albion and England.

Club career
Dickie Downs played for Barnsley between 1909 and 1912 and was a member of the team who contested the 1910 FA Cup Final against Newcastle but lost after forcing a replay. He won a FA Cup winners medal in 1912 when Barnsley beat West Bromwich Albion in another replay after the first match ended goalless. The Manchester Guardian, when reporting on both 1912 matches, selected him as one of the better players on the pitch.

Downs' career was broken by the First World War but he returned to Oakwell in 1919 and yet again proved an annoyance to West Bromwich Albion in 1920 when Barnsley knocked them out of the FA Cup.

By now Downs was thirty-three years of age and his performances in the cup alerted the top flight clubs that he was still good enough to play at the highest level. Downs had rejected many offers to step up during his career in the hope of gaining promotion with Barnsley but when Everton approached him after Barnsley's second round cup exit at the end of January 1920 he recognised it as his last chance and accepted a move to the First Division. Downs was an ever-present in his first full season at Goodison Park and went on to make ninety-two First Division appearances over five years but by 1923 he was finding it increasingly difficult to get into the first eleven and accepted an offer to step down into the third division with Brighton & Hove Albion.

International career
Downs' first season among the elite clubs was a success and brought him to the attention of the International selectors playing for England in a Home Championship game against Ireland on 23 October 1920 at Roker Park. England won 2–0.

Honours
Barnsley
FA Cup: winners 1912; runners-up 1910

References

1886 births
1949 deaths
People from Newton Aycliffe
Footballers from County Durham
English footballers
England international footballers
Association football fullbacks
Barnsley F.C. players
Everton F.C. players
Brighton & Hove Albion F.C. players
English Football League players
English Football League representative players
FA Cup Final players